The half dozen Kwerba languages form a small language family spoken in Jayapura Regency of Indonesian West Papua.

Languages
The languages are,
Bagusa
Kauwera (Kaowerawedj)
Kwerba (Sasawa, Air Mati)
Kwerba Mamberamo (Nopuk)
Trimuris

References

External links 
 Timothy Usher, New Guinea World, Kwerba

 
Languages of Indonesia
Kwerbic languages